Masako Imai (born 28 January 1967 in Setagaya) is a Japanese windsurfer. She competed in the 1996 Summer Olympics, the 2000 Summer Olympics, and the 2004 Summer Olympics.

References

External links
 
 
 

1967 births
Living people
Japanese windsurfers
Female windsurfers
Japanese female sailors (sport)
Olympic sailors of Japan
Sailors at the 1996 Summer Olympics – Mistral One Design
Sailors at the 2000 Summer Olympics – Mistral One Design
Sailors at the 2004 Summer Olympics – Mistral One Design
Asian Games bronze medalists for Japan
Asian Games medalists in sailing
Sailors at the 1998 Asian Games
Sailors at the 2002 Asian Games
Medalists at the 1998 Asian Games
Medalists at the 2002 Asian Games